The 2013 Canoe Marathon European Championships were the tenth edition of the Canoe Marathon European Championships, which took place between 7 and 9 June 2013 in Vila Verde, Portugal. The competition was staged on the Cávado River and consisted of fifteen events – ten in kayak and five in canoe – divided in junior, under-23 and senior categories.

Medalists

Juniors

Under 23

Seniors

Medal table

References

Canoe Marathon European Championships
Canoe Marathon European Championships
International sports competitions hosted by Portugal
Marathon European Championships
Canoeing in Portugal